Sarah De Nutte (born 21 November 1992) is a professional Luxembourgish table tennis player and the most successful Luxembourgish table tennis player so far. She competed in the 2020 Summer Olympics and won the women's doubles bronze medal at the 2021 World Table Tennis Championships alongside Ni Xia Lian. Since 1995, she is the first and only native European woman to win a medal at the world table tennis championships in women's doubles. She is the current World No. 3  in women's doubles alongside Ni Xia Lian. In June 2022, she was awarded the Knight Order of the Oak Crown by the Grand Duchy of Luxembourg for her performances for her country. She currently plays for the top-flight club TT Saint-Quentin in the french first division (Championnat de France - Pro A). She is right-handed and plays with the shakehand grip style.

References

External links

 ITTF Ranking
 Luxembourg Olympics Team

1992 births
Living people
Luxembourgian female table tennis players
European Games competitors for Luxembourg
Olympic table tennis players of Luxembourg
People from Dudelange
Table tennis players at the 2015 European Games
Table tennis players at the 2019 European Games
Table tennis players at the 2020 Summer Olympics
World Table Tennis Championships medalists